The 28th Golden Disc Awards ceremony was held on January 16, 2014. The JTBC network broadcast the show from Kyung Hee University's Grand Peace Palace in Seoul. Minho, Jung Yong-hwa and Yoon Doo-joon served as hosts on the first day, with Taeyeon, Tiffany and Oh Sang-jin on the second.

Criteria
Albums and songs released between January 1, 2013, and December 31, 2013, were eligible to be nominated for the 28th Golden Disc Awards. The winners of the digital music, album and rookie categories were determined by music sales (60%), a panel of music experts (20%) and online votes (20%). Music sales were based on data from Gaon Music Chart, Bugs!, Cyworld, Daum, Naver Music and Genie Music. The Popularity Award was based on online votes (80%) and a panel of music experts (20%).

Winners and nominees

Main awards
Winners and nominees are listed in alphabetical order. Winners are listed first and emphasized in bold.

Special awards

References

2014 in South Korean music
2014 music awards
Golden Disc Awards ceremonies